The First Epistle to the Corinthians is one of the Pauline epistles, part of the New Testament of the Christian Bible. The epistle is attributed to Paul the Apostle and a co-author, Sosthenes, and is addressed to the Christian church in Corinth. Scholars believe that Sosthenes was the amanuensis who wrote down the text of the letter at Paul's direction. It addresses various issues that had arisen in the Christian community at Corinth and is composed in a form of Koine Greek.

Authorship

There is a consensus among historians and theologians that Paul is the author of the First Epistle to the Corinthians. The letter is quoted or mentioned by the earliest of sources and is included in every ancient canon, including that of Marcion of Sinope. Some scholars point to the epistle's potentially embarrassing references to the existence of sexual immorality in the church as strengthening the case for the authenticity of the letter.

However, the epistle does contain a passage that is widely believed to have been interpolated into the text by a later scribe:

Verses 34–35 are included in all extant manuscripts. Part of the reason for suspecting that this passage is an interpolation is that in several manuscripts in the Western tradition, it is placed at the end of chapter 14 instead of at its canonical location. This kind of variability is generally considered by textual critics to be a sign that a note, initially placed in the margins of the document, has been copied into the body of the text by a scribe. As E. Earle Ellis and Daniel B. Wallace note, however, a marginal note may well have been written by Paul himself. The loss of marginal arrows or other directional devices could explain why the scribe of the Western Vorlage placed it at the end of the chapter. The absence of an asterisk or obelisk in the margin of any manuscript – a common way of indicating doubt of authenticity – they argue, a strong argument that Paul wrote the passage and intended it in its traditional place. The passage has also been taken to contradict 11:5, where women are described as praying and prophesying in church.

Furthermore, some scholars believe that the passage 1 Corinthians 10:1–22 constitutes a separate letter fragment or scribal interpolation because it equates the consumption of meat sacrificed to idols with idolatry, while Paul seems to be more lenient on this issue in 8:1–13 and 10:23–11:1. Such views are rejected by other scholars who give arguments for the unity of 8:1–11:1.

Composition
From there he traveled to Caesarea, and Antioch. Paul returned to Ephesus on his third missionary journey and spent approximately three years there. It was while staying in Ephesus that he received disconcerting news of the community in Corinth regarding jealousies, rivalry, and immoral behavior. It also appears that, based on a letter the Corinthians sent Paul, the congregation was requesting clarification on a number of matters, such as marriage and the consumption of meat previously offered to idols.

By comparing Acts of the Apostles 18:1–17 and mentions of Ephesus in the Corinthian correspondence, scholars suggest that the letter was written during Paul's stay in Ephesus, which is usually dated as being in the range of AD 53–57.

Anthony C. Thiselton suggests that it is possible that 1 Corinthians was written during Paul's first (brief) stay in Ephesus, at the end of his second journey, usually dated to early AD 54. However, it is more likely that it was written during his extended stay in Ephesus, where he refers to sending Timothy to them.

Despite the attributed title "1 Corinthians," this letter was not the first written by Paul to the church in Corinth, only the first canonical letter. 1 Corinthians is the second known letter of four from Paul to the church in Corinth, as evidenced by Paul's mention of his previous letter in 1 Corinthians 5:9. The other two being the "tearful, severe" letter mentioned in 2 Corinthians 2:3–4, and 2 Corinthians.

Structure

The epistle may be divided into seven parts:

 Salutation (1:1–3)
 Paul addresses the issue regarding challenges to his apostleship and defends the issue by claiming that it was given to him through a revelation from Christ. The salutation (the first section of the letter) reinforces the legitimacy of Paul's apostolic claim.
 Thanksgiving (1:4–9)
 The thanksgiving part of the letter is typical of Hellenistic letter writing. In a thanksgiving recitation the writer thanks God for health, a safe journey, deliverance from danger, or good fortune.
 In this letter, the thanksgiving "introduces charismata and gnosis, topics to which Paul will return and that he will discuss at greater length later in the letter".
 Division in Corinth (1:10–4:21)
 Facts of division
 Causes of division
 Cure for division
 Immorality in Corinth (5:1–6:20)
 Discipline an immoral Brother
 Resolving personal disputes
 Sexual purity
 Difficulties in Corinth (7:1–14:40)
 Marriage
 Christian liberty
 Worship
 Doctrine of Resurrection (15:1–58)
 Closing (16:1–24)
 Paul's closing remarks in his letters usually contain his intentions and efforts to improve the community. He would first conclude with his paraenesis and wish them peace by including a prayer request, greet them with his name and his friends with a holy kiss, and offer final grace and benediction:

Content

Some time before 2 Corinthians was written, Paul paid the church at Corinth a second visit to check some rising disorder, and wrote them a letter, now lost. The church had also been visited by Apollos, perhaps by Peter, and by some Jewish Christians who brought with them letters of commendation from Jerusalem.

Paul wrote 1 Corinthians letter to correct what he saw as erroneous views in the Corinthian church. Several sources informed Paul of conflicts within the church at Corinth: Apollos, a letter from the Corinthians, the "household of Chloe", and finally Stephanas and his two friends who had visited Paul. Paul then wrote this letter to the Corinthians, urging uniformity of belief ("that ye all speak the same thing and that there be no divisions among you", 1:10) and expounding Christian doctrine. Titus and a brother whose name is not given were probably the bearers of the letter to the church at Corinth.

In general, divisions within the church at Corinth seem to be a problem, and Paul makes it a point to mention these conflicts in the beginning. Specifically, pagan roots still hold sway within their community. Paul wants to bring them back to what he sees as correct doctrine, stating that God has given him the opportunity to be a "skilled master builder" to lay the foundation and let others build upon it.

Later, Paul wrote about immorality in Corinth by discussing an immoral brother, how to resolve personal disputes, and sexual purity. Regarding marriage, Paul states that it is better for Christians to remain unmarried, but that if they lacked self-control, it is better to marry than "burn". The epistle may include marriage as an apostolic practice in 1 Corinthians 9:5, "Do we not have the right to be accompanied by a believing wife, as do the other apostles and the brothers of the Lord and Cephas (Peter)?" (In the last case, the letter concurs with Matthew 8:14, which mentions Peter having a mother-in-law and thus, by inference, a wife.) However, the Greek word for 'wife' is the same word for 'woman'. The Early Church Fathers, including Tertullian, Jerome, and Augustine state the Greek word is ambiguous and the women in 1 Corinthians 9:5 were women ministering to the Apostles as women ministered to Christ, and were not wives, and assert they left their "offices of marriage" to follow Christ.

Paul also argues that married people must please their spouses, just as every Christian must please God. The letter is also notable for mentioning the role of women in churches, that for instance they must remain silent, and yet they have a role of prophecy and apparently speaking tongues in churches. If verse 14:34–35 is not an interpolation, certain scholars resolve the tension between these texts by positing that wives were either contesting their husband's inspired speeches at church, or the wives/women were chatting and asking questions in a disorderly manner when others were giving inspired utterances. Their silence was unique to the particular situation in the Corinthian gatherings at that time, and on this reading, Paul did not intend his words to be universalized for all women of all churches of all eras. After discussing his views on worshipping idols, Paul finally ends with his views on resurrection. He states that Christ died for the sins of humankind, and was buried, and rose on the third day according to the scriptures. Paul then asks: "Now if Christ is preached as raised from the dead, how can some of you say that there is no resurrection of the dead?" and addresses the question of resurrection.

Throughout the letter, Paul presents issues that are troubling the community in Corinth and offers ways to fix them. Paul states that this letter is to "admonish" them as beloved children. They are expected to become imitators of Jesus and follow the ways in Christ as he, Paul, teaches in all his churches.

This epistle contains some well-known phrases, including: "all things to all men", "through a glass, darkly", and "When I was a child, I spoke as a child, I understood as a child, I thought as a child".

Commentaries 
St. John Chrysostom, bishop of Constantinople and Doctor of the Catholic Church, wrote a commentary on 1 Corinthians, formed by 44 homilies.

See also
 1 Corinthians 10
 1 Corinthians 11 – on church order
 1 Corinthians 13 – the tongues of men and angels verse
 1 Corinthians 14 - prophesying
 1 Corinthians 15 – on the Resurrection
 Christian headcovering
 Pauline privilege
 Second Epistle to the Corinthians
 Textual variants in the First Epistle to the Corinthians
 Third Epistle to the Corinthians

Notes

References

Further reading 
 Blenkinsopp, Joseph, The Corinthian Mirror: a Study of Contemporary Themes in a Pauline Epistle [i.e. in First Corinthians], Sheed and Ward, London, 1964.
 Erdman, Charles R., The First Epistle of Paul to the Corinthians, Philadelphia: Westminster Press, 1966.
 Conzelmann, Hans Der erste Brief an die Korinther, KEK V, Göttingen 1969.
 Fitzmyer, Joseph A., First Corinthians : new translation with introduction and commentary, Anchor Yale Bible, Yale University Press, 2008.
 Robertson, A. and A. Plumber, A Critical and Exegetical Commentary on the First Epistle of St. Paul to the Corinthians (Edinburgh 1961).
 Thiselton, Anthony C., The First Epistle to the Corinthians: a commentary on the Greek text NIGTC, Wm. B. Eerdmans Publishing Co., Grand Rapids 2000.
 Yung Suk Kim. Christ's Body in Corinth: The Politics of a Metaphor (Fortress, 2008).

External links

 A Brief Introduction to 1 Corinthians
 International Standard Bible Encyclopedia: 1 Corinthians
 
 
 
  Various versions

 
1st-century Christian texts
Corinthians 1
Christianity in Roman Corinth
Corinthians 1
Pauline epistles